An autopista is a controlled-access highway in various Spanish-speaking countries
List of highways in Argentina includes autopistas of Argentina
List of autopistas and autovías in Spain
List of Mexican autopistas
Autopistas of Puerto Rico
List of Chilean freeways
Autopistas of Cuba

Types of roads